Oregon Public Broadcasting (OPB) is the primary television and radio public broadcasting network for most of the U.S. state of Oregon as well as southern Washington. OPB consists of five full-power television stations, dozens of VHF or UHF translators, and over 20 radio stations and frequencies. Broadcasts include local and regional programming as well as television programs from the Public Broadcasting Service (PBS) and American Public Television (APT), and radio programs from National Public Radio (NPR), American Public Media (APM), Public Radio Exchange (PRX), and the BBC World Service, among other distributors. Its headquarters and television studios are located in Portland.

OPB is also a major producer of television programming for national broadcast on PBS and Create through distributors like APT, with shows such as History Detectives, Barbecue America, Foreign Exchange, Rick Steves' Europe, and travel shows hosted by Art Wolfe.

, OPB had over one million viewers throughout its region and an average of over 380,000 radio listeners each week. The part of southwestern Oregon not served by OPB is served by KLCC radio, Jefferson Public Radio, and Southern Oregon PBS.

History

20th century

OPB traces its roots to January 23, 1923, when KFDJ signed on from the Corvallis campus of Oregon Agricultural College (now Oregon State University). The radio station's call letters were changed to KOAC on December 11, 1925. In 1932, KOAC became a service of the Oregon State Board of Higher Education General Extension Division

KOAC Radio won OPB's first Peabody Award when it was recognized for Outstanding Public Service by a Local Station for a 1942 program called Our Hidden Enemy, Venereal Disease.

KOAC-TV in Corvallis began operations on October 7, 1957. KOAC-AM-TV soon became the primary stations for a large statewide network of radio and television stations. Originally known as Oregon Educational Broadcasting, it became the Oregon Educational and Public Broadcasting Service (OEPBS) in 1971. In 1981, OEPBS was spun off from the Oregon State System of Higher Education and became a separate state agency, Oregon Public Broadcasting. The former Portland satellites, KOAP-FM-TV, became the flagship stations. In 1993, OPB severed its last direct ties to the state government and became a community-licensed organization supported by the state of Oregon.

In addition to the studio and transmission facilities in Corvallis, there was another production studio located on the top floor of Villard Hall at the University of Oregon in Eugene that was connected by microwave link. Up until 1965, all programs from the Eugene studio were live, since they did not get any video recording equipment until then. During that time period, the Eugene studio operated two RCA TK31 cameras.

KOAP-TV in Portland signed on the air February 6, 1961; it became the flagship of OPB in 1981 and changed its call letters to KOPB-TV on February 15, 1989.

KTVR-TV in La Grande began broadcasting on December 6, 1964, as a commercial television station that affiliated primarily with NBC and also carried select ABC network programs. KTVR operated as a semi-satellite of Boise, Idaho station KTVB, but had a La Grande studio at 1605 Adams Ave., producing a nightly newscast and other local programming. However, by 1967, the La Grande studio and office had been closed and KTVR became a full-fledged satellite of KTVB. KTVR was unique in the Pacific Time Zone, because as a repeater of a Mountain Time Zone station, its "prime-time" schedule was broadcast from 6 to 9 p.m. OEPBS bought KTVR on August 31, 1976, and converted it to PBS on February 1, 1977. At first, KTVR rebroadcast programming from KWSU-TV in Pullman, Washington and KSPS-TV in Spokane, Washington until OEPBS completed a transmission link to La Grande. On September 1, 1977, OEPBS took KTVR off the air for transmitter repairs, due to increasing technical problems. KTVR returned to the air on January 1, 1978, carrying OEPBS programming for the first time.

KOAB-TV in Bend began broadcasting on February 24, 1970, as KVDO-TV, a commercial independent station licensed to Salem. Channel 3 struggled to compete with Portland's established independent, KPTV (channel 12), and in 1972, the station was purchased by Liberty Communications, then-owners of Eugene's ABC affiliate KEZI (channel 9). The intention was to make KVDO a full-power satellite of KEZI. During the sale, KATU (channel 2), Portland's ABC affiliate, objected over duplication of programming, and there were also objections to Liberty's common ownership of local cable systems and the television station. As a result, the Federal Communications Commission (FCC) allowed Liberty to buy KVDO-TV on the condition that it sell the station within three years.

The state government approved the purchase of KVDO-TV in 1975, with OEPBS taking control of the station on February 19, 1976. Nine days later, on February 28, a disgruntled viewer protesting KVDO's sale to OEPBS cut guy wires, toppling the channel 3 transmitter tower. On September 20, 1976, KVDO signed back on the air with a new tower; from then until March 31, 1981, the station broadcast an alternate program lineup to KOAP-TV and KOAC-TV, featuring time-shifted OEPBS programs, shows for the Spanish-speaking population in the Willamette Valley, and several local productions in Salem. OEPBS consistently eyed moving the station elsewhere to reduce duplication, which became more acute when budget cuts prompted KVDO-TV to drop its separate programs in 1981. The network pursued and won approval from the FCC to move the channel 3 allocation and license to Bend, which had no PBS coverage. KVDO-TV ceased broadcasting in Salem on July 31, 1983; on December 22, channel 3 signed back on the air as KOAB. The call letters were modified to KOAB-TV when KOAB-FM signed on the air January 23, 1986.

KOAC won a 1972 Peabody Award for a program called Conversations with Will Shakespeare and Certain of His Friends. KEPB-TV in Eugene began operation on February 27, 1990, as Eugene's first public television station, bringing most of Eugene a clear signal for PBS programming from the first time ever. Although KOAC-TV had long claimed Eugene as part of its primary coverage area (Corvallis is part of the Eugene market), it only provided rimshot coverage to most of Eugene itself, and was marginal at best in the southern portion of the city. Most of Eugene could only get a clear picture from KOAC-TV on cable.

In the early 2000s, OPB installed Oregon's first digital transmitter, taking a critical first step in the digital television transition.

21st century
For 2001 and 2002, the Oregon state government provided about 14 percent of OPB's operational budget; for 2003 and 2004, it was cut to 9 percent.

In 2007, OPB Radio added World Have Your Say (WHYS) to its schedule, with its listeners becoming the show's most numerous contributors from the United States and second in number worldwide only to Nigeria. According to WHYS host Ros Atkins, a "significant number of listeners [disliked the] 'tone' and 'production'" of the show, resulting in the removal of the show from OPB's schedule after three years.

On December 4, 2007, OPB launched OPBmusic, a 24-hour online radio channel spotlighting Pacific Northwest musicians. In March 2009, the Corporation for Public Broadcasting chose OPB to manage the pilot version of American Archive, CPB's initiative to digitally preserve content created by public broadcasters.

In 2010, OPB won a 2009 Peabody Award for a radio series called Hard Times, which followed a group of Oregonians through the recession year of 2009.

On June 7, 2014, the Northwest Chapter of the National Academy of Television Arts and Sciences held their 51st Regional Emmy Awards: OPB and its staff won 10 Emmys:
 

 OPB received the Emmy for Station Excellence.
 Oregon Field Guide won the Emmy for Environmental Program/Special.
 Oregon Field Guide: "The White Salmon River Runs Free" shared the Emmy for Public/Current/Community Affairs Program/Special.
 Oregon Field Guide: "Glacier Caves Mt. Hood's Secret World" won two Emmys, for Documentary Topical and Writer Program (Ed Jahn & Amelia Templeton).
 Diving for Science shared the Emmy for Health/Science Program/Special.
 Giles Clement won the Emmy for Informational/Instructional Feature/Segment.
 Hanford won the Emmy for Documentary Historical.
 Vince Patton Vince Patton Reporting won for Reporter Programming.
 Tom Shrider James DeRosso won the Emmy for Video Journalist No Time Limit.

Television stations

Notes:

Cable and satellite availability
OPB Television is available on all cable providers in its service area. On Dish Network, KOPB-TV, KEPB-TV, and KOAB-TV are available on the Portland, Eugene and Bend local broadcast station lineups, respectively. KOPB-TV and KEPB-TV are available on the Portland and Eugene DirecTV broadcast station lineups.

Digital television
OPB's first digital channel was OPB CREATE (an affiliate of the Create network), announced in January 2006; its availability was limited to certain Comcast digital cable customers and on Clear Creek Television in Oregon City.

In December 2008, in anticipation of the original February 18, 2009, deadline for switching to all-digital broadcasting, OPB announced the launch of three digital subchannels: OPB, which would air OPB programming with an "improved picture for viewers with traditional sets", OPB HD, airing programming in "high definition with the highest-quality picture and sound", and OPB Plus, which offered "more choices in viewing times and added programs in news, public affairs and lifestyle."

Digital channels
OPB currently offers four digital multiplex channels:

OPB was one of the partners of The Oregon Channel, a public affairs network that began with the 74th Oregon Legislative Assembly in 2007. Programming consisted of Oregon legislative sessions and other public affairs events. The Oregon Channel was discontinued in 2011.

All of OPB's digital channels are also available on cable providers Comcast Xfinity, Charter Spectrum and Frontier FiOS, and three other providers serving specific regions and communities in Oregon: Clear Creek (a cooperative serving the Redland area of Oregon City), BendBroadband (serving Central Oregon), and Crestview Cable Communications (serving Madras, Prineville, and La Pine).

On July 6, 2011, OPB combined OPB and OPB SD into one high-definition channel feed on the main channel of its digital stations. OPB Plus moved from the third digital subchannel to the second subchannel and OPB Radio moved from the fourth digital subchannel to the third subchannel.

Analog-to-digital conversion
During 2009, OPB shut down the analog transmitters of the stations on a staggered basis. The station's digital channel allocations post-transition are as follows:
 KOAC-TV shut down its analog signal, over VHF channel 7; the station's digital signal relocated from its pre-transition UHF channel 39 to VHF channel 7.
 KOPB-TV shut down its analog, signal, over VHF channel 10; the station's digital signal relocated from its pre-transition UHF channel 27 to VHF channel 10.
 KEPB-TV shut down its analog signal, over UHF channel 28; the station's digital signal remained on its pre-transition UHF channel 28. Through the use of PSIP, digital television receivers display the station's virtual channel as its former UHF analog channel 28.
 KOAB-TV shut down its analog signal, over VHF channel 3; the station's digital signal remained on its pre-transition VHF channel 11. Through the use of PSIP, digital television receivers display the station's virtual channel as its former VHF analog channel 3.
 KTVR shut down its analog signal, over VHF channel 13; the station's digital signal relocated from its pre-transition VHF channel 5 to channel 13.

Translators

Low-power translators in Elkton, Glendale, Mapleton, Myrtle Point, Newport, Oakland, Oakridge, and Swisshome have been discontinued.

Radio stations

Notes:

Since the spring of 2009, OPB has operated jazz radio station KMHD; the station is owned by Mount Hood Community College, but operates out of OPB's studio facilities in Portland.

HD stations
Currently only KMHD and KOPB-FM carry HD radio content.

The OPB HD radio channels are:

Other radio frequencies
Halfway 91.3 FM
Happy Hollow, Oregon 93.5 FM
Nedonna Beach 106.5 FM
Richland 91.9 FM
Silver Lake (Lake County) 91.7 FM
Riley 90.3 FM K212AQ (50 watts) 
Mount Vernon 90.7 FM K214AQ (25 watts) 
Pacific City 93.5 FM K228DT (10 watts) 
Walton 98.3 FM K252DL (8 watts) 
Corvallis 103.1 FM K276BU (15 watts) 
Astoria 104.5 FM K283BT (70 watts) 
Nedonna Beach 106.5 FM K293BL (10 watts) 

Translators upgrading to full-power stations:
Wagontire (Harney County) 90.3 FM (CP: KOHP 90.7 FM Hines )

Podcasting 
In addition to their work in radio and television, OPB has produced multiple podcasts. For instance, OPB started a podcast in 2008 called Think Out Loud. OPB also began producing a weekly podcast about local politics called OPB Politics Now, which is hosted by Geoff Norcross. OPB produced a 2018 podcast hosted by Leah Sottile entitled Bundyville that discussed Cliven Bundy and the sovereign citizen movement. The following year they produced the second season of the podcast entitled Bundyville: The Remnant, which discussed right wing extremism and anti-government extremism in America more broadly. In 2020, OPB produced a podcast called Timber Wars. The podcast was hosted by Aaron Scott and discussed the 1990s conflicts in the Pacific Northwest between loggers and environmentalists.

See also
 Barry Serafin Early OPB news reporter
 Soccer Made in Germany 1980s highlights of West German soccer games, distributed nationwide by OPB

References

External links

The Remembered Years – KOAC history
“Oregon Field Guide Education Program; Focus on Organisms; Part 1,” 1994–03, The Walter J. Brown Media Archives & Peabody Awards Collection at the University of Georgia, American Archive of Public Broadcasting
“Oregon Field Guide Education Program; Focus on Organisms; Part 2,” 1994–03, The Walter J. Brown Media Archives & Peabody Awards Collection at the University of Georgia, American Archive of Public Broadcasting

 
PBS member networks
NPR member networks

Mass media in Portland, Oregon
Organizations based in Portland, Oregon
Peabody Award winners
American radio networks
Television stations in Oregon
1923 establishments in Oregon